Saint-Étienne-de-Fontbellon is a commune in the Ardèche department in southern France.

Population

See also
Communes of the Ardèche department

References

External links
Website presenting the town of Saint-Etienne-De-Fontbellon (Ardèche, France)

Communes of Ardèche
Ardèche communes articles needing translation from French Wikipedia